New Castle County Vocational-Technical School District (NCCVTSD or NCC Vo-Tech) is a public vocational-technical school district serving New Castle County, Delaware. Its headquarters are located at Delcastle Technical High School, in an unincorporated area in the county.

Each year, one-fourth of all eighth-grade students attending New Castle County public schools apply for admission to a vo-tech high school. Students who are accepted begin in a ninth grade exploratory program, which exposes them to career options before they elect a specific course of study.  They are able to choose to study one of 42 different careers in one of six clusters: Business, Communications, and Computers; Construction Technologies; Health Services; Public and Consumer Services; Science, Energy, and Drafting Technologies; and Transportation.

Schools
The district boasts four institutions, each with unique career programs and extracurricular activities.

References

External links
 New Castle County Vocational-Technical School District

School districts in New Castle County, Delaware
Wilmington, Delaware